Ponitka is a Polish surname. Notable people with the surname include:
 (born 1952), German illustrator 
Marcel Ponitka (born 1997), Polish basketball player
Mateusz Ponitka (born 1993), Polish basketball player

See also
 

Polish-language surnames